Income inequality in India refers to the unequal distribution of wealth and income among its citizens. According to the CIA World Factbook, the Gini coefficient of India, which is a measure of income distribution inequality, was 35.2 in 2011, ranking 95th out of 157. Wealth distribution is also uneven, with one report estimating that 54% of the country's wealth is controlled by millionaires, the second highest after Russia, as of November 2016. The richest 1% of Indians own 58% of wealth, while the richest 10% of Indians own 80% of the wealth. This trend has consistently increased, meaning the rich are getting richer much faster than the poor, widening the income gap. Inequality worsened since the establishment of income tax in 1922, overtaking the British Raj's record of the share of the top 1% in national income, which was 20.7% in 1939–40.

Income gaps 

According to Thomas Piketty, it is difficult to accurately measure wealth inequality in India because of large gaps in income tax data. Official data from 1997-2000 contained many inconsistencies, while no data was published between 2000-2012. Then, in 2013, official income tax figures showed that only 1% of Indians paid tax that year, while only 2% filed a tax return. This lack of reliable data makes it essentially impossible to make significant, numerical conclusions about income inequality in India.

Since much of the population is not represented in income-tax databases, most of the calculations (such as NSSO) are based on consumption-expenditure data instead of income data. According to the World Bank, the Gini coefficient in India was 0.339 in 2009, down from previous values of 0.43 (1995–96) and 0.45 (2004–05). However, in 2016, the International Monetary Fund, in its regional economic outlook for Asia and the Pacific, said that India’s Gini coefficient rose from 0.45 (1990) to 0.51 (2013).

According to the 2015 World Wealth Report, India had 198,000 high-net-worth individuals with a combined wealth of $785 billion.

Class divide

Credit Suisse’s Global Wealth Databook for 2014 reports that the bottom 10% of the Indian society owned merely 0.2% of national wealth, while the richest 10% have been getting steadily richer since 2000.

Causes 

N. C. Saxena, a member of the National Advisory Council, suggested that the widening income disparity can be accounted for by India's badly shaped agricultural and rural safety nets. "Unfortunately, agriculture is in a state of collapse. Per capita food production is going down. Rural infrastructure such as power, road transport facilities are in a poor state," he said. "All the safety net programmes are not working at all, with rural job scheme and public distribution system performing far below their potential. This has added to the suffering of rural India while market forces are acting in favour of urban India, which is why it is progressing at a faster rate."

Impact 

India's economy continues to grow with its GDP rising faster than most nations. But a rise in national GDP is not indicative of income equality in the country. The growing income inequality in India has negatively impacted poor citizens' access to education and healthcare. Rising income inequality makes it difficult for the poor to climb up the economic ladder and increases their risk of being victims to poverty trap. People living at the bottom 10% are characterized by low wages; long working hours; lack of basic services such as first aid, drinking water and sanitation.

References

Income in India
Income distribution
India